Ștefan Ghiță (born 16 February 1926) was a Romanian alpine skier. He competed in two events at the 1952 Winter Olympics.

References

External links
 

1926 births
Possibly living people
Romanian male alpine skiers
Olympic alpine skiers of Romania
Alpine skiers at the 1952 Winter Olympics
Sportspeople from Brașov